Alessandro Ferri (February 25, 19212003) was an Italian professional football player.

He started playing as a child with S.S. Lazio and went through every youth team the club had. On January 15, 1939, he came to get the tickets for the Derby della Capitale game against fierce city rivals A.S. Roma, like he has been doing for several previous years. Club president told him: "Today you don't need tickets, you're playing". He became a regular in the Lazio defence for several years.

In his last Serie A game for Lazio he scored his only league goal for them, on November 30, 1947, in a 1–1 draw against Atalanta B.C.

The next season, after financial disagreements with the club management, he transferred to the rival A.S. Roma team.

Overall, he played 9 seasons (148 games, 2 goals) in the Serie A for Lazio and Roma.

1921 births
2003 deaths
Italian footballers
Serie A players
S.S. Lazio players
Taranto F.C. 1927 players
A.S. Roma players
Reggina 1914 players
Association football defenders